The Brauntex Theatre is a former movie palace (now a performing arts theater) located in downtown New Braunfels in the U.S. state of Texas. It was built in the late Art Deco period in 1942. It is listed on the National Register of Historic Places.

History

The Brauntex Theatre first opened in downtown New Braunfels in January 1942. Pearl Harbor had just been attacked, and the United States was at war. Patrons needed a place where they could attempt to ease their worry of loved ones in the war and catch up on the status of the war. It premiered with Birth of the Blues, starring Bing Crosby. At the time there were many other operational theaters in the city, but when the state-of-the-art Brauntex Theatre opened, it was the best. A major fire in one of the other downtown theaters, the Palace, either just before or just after the Brauntex opened, made the new theater an even more welcome addition to the city. The Griffith Company owned the theater. Its design was copied from an earlier Griffith theater in New Cordell, Oklahoma, the Washita Theater. The old theater was an important part of downtown New Braunfels for fifty years. Many members of the staff recalls many highlights of the early movie operations such as the time that Pedro Gonzalez appeared while filming the John Wayne classic, The Alamo. The theater was integrated during the 1960s. After integration patrons could sit anywhere in the theater; 40 cents upstairs or 50 cents downstairs.

Renovation

Slowly over time this once grand establishment with smartly dressed ushers and a bright neon sign became a ghost of years past. Through the dust one could still see the gilded fittings of the Brauntex, but the seats were broken and the theater reeked of cigarette smoke. In September 1998 a local group of city and county officials, artists, engineers, an attorney, a performing arts technician, bank officials and many other concerned citizens, came together to try to save this once great theater. This plan soon grew and the whole city was eager to save this beauty. This group of 36 diverse participants had meetings, brainstorming the needs of the building as well as its potential uses. Out of this the committee decided to mold this run-down movie palace into a full-scale theater which was to be run by the Brauntex Performing Arts Theatre Association.

The plan had to be set aside due to the October 1998 Central Texas floods. When the city of New Braunfels had recovered, the plan to renovate the Brauntex was put back into place. In July 1999 corporate non-profit status was acquired, the Association elected officers and directors and contracted a management consultment and a grant writer. On August 31, 1999 the earnest money contract was signed and on December 10, 1999 the Association became proud owners of the dilapidated gem, the Brauntex Theatre.

Almost immediately after the Association acquired the property, renovation begun. Plans were drawn, ideas were submitted, and money was raised to give this structure a much needed face-lift. One of the first tasks the Association had was expanding the tiny movie theater stage, into a large performing arts stage. The other major structural change was to restore the balcony to its former glory, as the previous owner had closed it off to create a second theater.

The renovation crew included many different local groups who volunteered to overhaul the theatre, including the USMC Junior ROTC from New Braunfels High School. A group of women, who dubbed themselves as the Brauntex Sweatshop, had to sew 600 seat covers alone. The renovation was completed quickly and the grand reopening of the Brauntex Theatre had the San Antonio Symphony grace their stage. The opening night was sold out and was a huge and grand success for this once great movie palace.

See also

National Register of Historic Places listings in Comal County, Texas

References

Brauntex Theatre website
Sophienburg Museum website
History of New Braunfels and Comal County, Texas 1844-1946 by Oscar Haas

External links

Theatres completed in 1942
Buildings and structures in Comal County, Texas
Moderne architecture in Texas
Theatres on the National Register of Historic Places in Texas
Tourist attractions in Comal County, Texas
New Braunfels, Texas
1942 establishments in Texas
National Register of Historic Places in Comal County, Texas